Arugisa lutea, the common arugisa moth, is a species of moth in the family Erebidae. The species was first described by John B. Smith in 1900. It is found in the United States, where it has been recorded from Maryland and Virginia to Florida, west to Texas and Missouri.

The wingspan is about 17 mm. The forewings are light brownish yellow with irregular dark brown or gray antemedial, postmedial and subterminal lines. There is a dark blotch over the middle of the antemedial line and the reniform and orbicular spots are represented by black dots. There is a dark shading along the inside edge of the subterminal line and the postmedial line is overlaid with black dots. The hindwings are brownish gray with a thin dark terminal line. Adults are mostly on wing from May to October, but have been recorded on wing nearly year round in Florida.

The larvae feed on both living and dead grasses. They have also been recorded feeding on blue-green algae.

References

Moths described in 1902
Scolecocampinae
Moths of North America